The 2018–19 EFL League Two (referred to as the Sky Bet League Two for sponsorship reasons) was the 15th season of Football League Two under its current title and the 26th season under its current league division format.

Team changes

To League Two 
Promoted from National League
 Macclesfield Town
 Tranmere Rovers

Relegated from League One
 Bury
 Milton Keynes Dons
 Northampton Town
 Oldham Athletic

From League Two 
Promoted to League One
 Accrington Stanley
 Luton Town
 Wycombe Wanderers
 Coventry City

Relegated to National League
 Chesterfield
 Barnet

Stadiums

Personnel and sponsoring

 1 According to current revision of List of current Premier League and English Football League managers.

Managerial changes

League table

Play-offs

Results

Statistics

Top scorers

Hat-tricks

References

 
EFL League Two seasons
1
4
Eng